This is a list of lighthouses in Mauritania.

Lighthouses

See also
List of lighthouses in Morocco (to the north)
List of lighthouses in Senegal (to the south)
 Lists of lighthouses and lightvessels

References

External links

Mauritania
Lighthouses
Lighthouses